Parliament of Korea may refer to

the National Assembly of the Republic of Korea, the unicameral legislature of South Korea
the Supreme People's Assembly, the unicameral legislature of North Korea